Anchomenus aeneolus is a species of beetle in the family Carabidae. It is found in Alberta and British Columbia, Canada and the U.S. states such as Idaho, Montana, Oregon, and Washington.

References

Further reading

 
 
 

Harpalinae
Beetles described in 1854
Beetles of North America
Taxa named by John Lawrence LeConte